Papilio fernandus is a species of swallowtail butterfly from the genus Papilio that is found in Equatorial Guinea.

Taxonomy
It is a member of the zenobia species group. In the zenobia group the basic upperside wing pattern is black with white or yellowish bands and spots. The underside is brown and basally there is a red area marked with black stripes and spots. In the discal area there is a yellowish band with black stripes and veins. Females resemble Amauris butterflies. Both sexes lack tails.
The clade members are:

Papilio cyproeofila Butler, 1868 
Papilio fernandus Fruhstorfer, 1903
Papilio filaprae Suffert, 1904
Papilio gallienus Distant, 1879 
Papilio mechowi Dewitz, 1881
Papilio mechowianus Dewitz, 1885
Papilio nobicea Suffert, 1904 
Papilio zenobia Fabricius, 1775

Description
It is very similar to Papilio cyproeofila and the very short description of  P. fernandus  places it as a local race of  P. cyproeofila.

Gallery

References

Bibliography
Fruhstorfer, 1903 Papilio cypraeafila [sic] fernandus  nov. subspec Fruhstorfer, 1903 Stettin ent. Ztg 64 (2) : 360

External links
Images at Swallowtails 
Global Butterfly Information System Images (as  subgenus Druryia)

fernandus
Butterflies described in 1903
Butterflies of Africa
Taxa named by Hans Fruhstorfer